Javier Tomeo (9 September 1932 – 22 June 2013) was a Spanish (Aragonese) essayist, dramatist, and novelist.

Two of Tomeo's works have been translated into English, The Coded Letter (1979) and Dear Monster (1984), by Anthony Edkins in 1991.

Bibliography

Source:

Historia de la esclavitud, [con el pseudónimo Frantz Keller, Barcelona: Forma] (1962)
La brujería y la superstición en Cataluña [junto a Juan María Estadella] (1963)
El cazador (1967)
Ceguera al azul (1969)
El unicornio (1971)
Los enemigos (1974)
El castillo de la carta cifrada (1979). Translated by Anthony Edkins as The Coded Letter (1991)
Amado monstruo (1984). Translated by Anthony Edkins as Dear Monster (1991)
Historias mínimas (1988)
El cazador de leones (1989)
La ciudad de las palomas (1990)
El mayordomo miope (1990)
El gallitigre (1990)
El discutido testamento de Gastón de Puyparlier(1990)
Problemas oculares (1990)
Patio de butacas (1991)
Preparativos de viaje (1991)
Diálogo en re mayor (1991)
La agonía de Proserpina (1993)
Zoopatías y zoofilias(1993)
Los reyes del huerto (1994)
El nuevo bestiario (1994)
El crimen del cine Oriente (1995)
Conversaciones con mi amigo Ramón (1995)
Los bosques de Nyx (1995)
La máquina voladora (1996)
Los misterios de la ópera (1997)
Un día en el zoo (1997)
El alfabeto (1997)
Napoleón VII (1999)
La rebelión de los rábanos (1999)
Patíbulo interior (2000)
La patria de las hormigas (2000)
Otoño en Benasque, los Pirineos (2000)
Bestiario (2000)
El canto de las tortugas (2000)
La soledad de los pirómanos (2001)
Cuentos perversos (2002)
La mirada de la muñeca hinchable (2003)
Los nuevos inquisidores (2004)
El cantante de boleros (2005)
Doce cuentos de Andersen contados por dos viejos verdes (2005)
La noche del lobo (2006)
Bestiario (illustrated by Natalio Bayo) (2007)
Los amantes de silicona (2008)
Pecados griegos (2009)

References

1932 births
2013 deaths
20th-century Spanish writers
20th-century Spanish male writers
21st-century Spanish writers
Aragonese writers
Deaths from diabetes
Spanish essayists
Spanish male dramatists and playwrights
Spanish novelists
Spanish male novelists
20th-century Spanish novelists
20th-century Spanish dramatists and playwrights
Male essayists
20th-century essayists
21st-century essayists
21st-century Spanish male writers